The Geneva International Music Competition is one of the world's leading international music competitions, founded in 1939. In 1957, it was one of the founding members of the World Federation of International Music Competition (WFIMC), whose headquarters are in Geneva.

Today, the Geneva Competition alternates between several main disciplines: piano, flute, oboe, clarinet, cello, viola, string quartet, voice and percussion. Every second year, it offers a Composition Prize. Upcoming competitions are cello & oboe (2021), piano & composition (2022), flute & string quartet (2023) and voice & composition (2024).

Its prizewinners include world-famous artists such as Martha Argerich, Arturo Benedetti-Michelangeli, Victoria de los Ángeles, Alan Gilbert, Nelson Goerner, Friedrich Gulda, Heinz Holliger, Nobuko Imai, Melos Quartet, Emmanuel Pahud, Maurizio Pollini, Georg Solti, José van Dam, Christian Zacharias and Tabea Zimmermann.

In addition to its official prizes, the Geneva International Music Competition offers a career development programme, which provides precious support and advice to help boost laureates’ careers. This programme includes two years of concert management, as well as CD recordings, international tours, a festival and professional workshops.

1st prize winners 

1939 Clarinet Robert Gugolz 
1939 Piano Arturo Benedetti Michelangeli 
1939 Voice Maria Stader, 
1942 Piano Georg Solti 
1947 Clarinet Henri Druart 
1950 Clarinet Paul-Jacques Lambert 
1953 Piano Jacques Klein 
1954 Voice Pamela Bowden 
1957 Clarinet Petko Radev 
1957 Piano Dominique Merlet  (ex aequo)
1957 Piano Martha Argerich  (ex aequo)
1959 Oboe Heinz Holliger 
1960 Clarinet Peter Rieckhoff 
1961 Piano Désiré N'Kaoua 
1961 Flute Michel Debost 
1962 Organ Joachim Grubich 
1971 Cello Myung-wha Chung 
1972 Clarinet Thomas Friedli 
1972 Viola Atar Arad 
1972 Voice Konstantin Ploujnikov 
1973 Double Bass Ivan Kotov 
1973 Flute Kohno Toshiko 
1973 Quartet Quatuor Kreuzberger 
1973 Trombone Anatole Skobelev 
1974 Harp Olga Ortenberg 
1974 Voice Gary Kendall 
1975 Guitar Dusan Bogdanovic 
1976 Piano Tatiana Chebanova 
1976 Voice Katherine Ciesinski 
1977 Oboe Jean-Christophe Gayot 
1977 Viola AnaBela Chaves 
1977 Voice Kristine Ciesinski 
1978 Voice Margareta Haverinen 
1979 Voice Jean Christian 
1980 Bassoon Gilbert Audin 
1980 Vocal Quartet New York Vocal Ensemble 
1982 Percussion Peter Sadlo 
1982 Piano Evgeny Krouchevsky 
1982 Viola Tabea Zimmermann 
1983 Bass Nico Abondolo 
1983 Voice Juliana Gondek 
1984 Conducting Grzegorz Nowak 
1985 Organ Jonathan Biggers 
1985 Voice Chihiro Bamba 
1986 Cello Leonid Gorokhov 
1987 Trumpet Ole Edvard Antonsen 
1987 Viola Hong-Mei Xiao 
1987 Voice Maria Diaconu 
1988 Guitar Viktor Vidović 
1988 Oboe Alex Klein 
1988 Trombone Jonas Bylund 
1990 Clarinet Fabio Di-Casola 
1990 Piano Nelson Goerner 
1990 Violin Zheng-Rong Wang 
1991 Cello Wenn-Sinn Yang 
1991 Tuba Jens Bjørn-Larsen 
1992 Flute Emmanuel Pahud 
1993 Organ: Alessio Corti 
1993 Violin Manara Francesco 
1993 Voice: Jane Irwin 
1994 Conducting: Alan Gilbert 
1995 Bassoon: Laurent Lefèvre 
1995 Cello: Claudio Bohorquez 
1995 Guitar: Georgi Vassiliev 
1996 Trumpet: André Henry 
1997 Clarinet: Martin Fröst 
1998 Double Bass: Janusz Widzyk 
1998 Oboe: Alexei Ogrintchouk 
2000 Cello: Rafael Rosenfeld 
2000 Voice: Annette Dasch  (ex aequo)
2000 Voice: Werner Erik Nelson  (ex aequo)
2001 Flute: Silvia Careddu 
2001 Piano: Roland Krüger 
2001 Quartet: Quatuor Terpsycordes 
2002 Percussion: Aiyun Huang 
2002 Piano: Sergey Koudriakov 
2005 Viola: Ryszard Groblewski 
2008 Cello: István Várdai 
2009 Voice: Polina Pasztircsák 
2010 Piano: Mami Hagiwara 
2011 Composition: Artur Akshelyan 
2011 Quartet: Artemis Quartet  (ex aequo)
2011 Quartet: Hermès Quartet  (ex aequo)
2012 Piano: Lorenzo Soulès 
2013 Composition: Kwang Ho Cho 
2014 Piano: Ji-Yeong Mun 
2015 Composition: Shoichi Yabuta 
2016 Quartet: Vision String Quartet 
2017 Composition: Jaehyuck Choi 
2018 Clarinet: Kevin Spagnolo 
2018 Piano: Théo Fouchenneret  (ex aequo)
2018 Piano: Dmitry Shishkin  (ex aequo)
2019 Composition: Daniel Arango-Prada  (ex aequo)
2019 Composition: Hinako Takagi  (ex aequo)
2019 Percussion: Hyeji Bak, 

Search all prizewinners from 1939

Previous Disciplines
1995 and before, the competition also included a prize for Bassoon.

See also
 :Category:Winners of the Geneva International Music Competition

References

External links
Main website
History and List of Most Notable Winners 
E-Shop Prizewinners CDs
World Federation of International Music Competitions (WFIMC) website

Music competitions in Switzerland
Swiss music
Events in Geneva
1939 establishments in Switzerland
Recurring events established in 1939